Sumeeh Bar (also Romanized as Şūme‘eh Bar, Şowma‘eh Bar, Şowme‘eh Bar, and Sowme‘eh Bar; also known as Samabar, Samāvar, and Semāvar) is a village in Gilvan Rural District, in the Central District of Tarom County, Zanjan Province, Iran. At the 2006 census, its population was 155, in 40 families.

References 

Populated places in Tarom County